Lê Thụy Hải (1944/1945 – 7 May 2021) was a Vietnamese football player and manager.

Playing career
Lê Thụy Hải played for CLB Đường Sắt between 1965 and 1980, and also played for the Vietnam national team.

Coaching career
After retiring as a player in 1980, Lê Thụy Hải began his coaching career in 1995 with CLB Đường Sắt as an assistant coach. He managed Binh Duong, leading them to 3 national championships. He also managed Da Nang, Thanh Hóa, Thể Công, Ninh Bình and Haiphong.

Later life and death
He died on 7 May 2021, aged 76, due to pancreatic cancer.

References

1940s births
2021 deaths
Vietnamese footballers
Vietnam international footballers
Vietnamese football managers
Becamex Binh Duong FC managers
SHB Da Nang FC managers
Thanh Hóa FC (1962) managers
Viettel FC managers
Vissai Ninh Bình FC managers
Haiphong FC managers
Association football coaches
Association footballers not categorized by position